Lambuth University was a private Methodist university in Jackson, Tennessee. It was active from 1843 to 2011 and was supported by the Memphis Annual Conference of the United Methodist Church. The university began as the Memphis Conference Female Institute in 1843 and was later renamed in honor of Walter Russell Lambuth (1854–1921), a Methodist missionary who traveled globally.

After several years of financial struggles, the Southern Association of Colleges and Schools opted not to renew Lambuth's accreditation in 2011.  Due to both the financial and accreditation problems, the Board of Trustees voted in April 2011 to cease operations two months later.  Final commencement exercises were held April 30, 2011. The University of Memphis acquired the campus which is now the Lambuth branch campus of the University of Memphis.

Athletics
The Lambuth athletic teams were called the Eagles. They participated in dual membership with both the National Association of Intercollegiate Athletics (NAIA) and the NCAA Division II ranks, primarily competing as an NAIA Independent within the Association of Independent Institutions (AII) and an NCAA D-II Independent in transition as a provisional member from 2008–09 to 2010–11. The Eagles previously competed as full members for the TranSouth Athletic Conference (TranSouth or TSAC) from 2006–07 to 2007–08, and for the Mid-South Conference (MSC) from 1995–96 to 2005–06; both from the NAIA.

Lambuth competed in 11 intercollegiate sports: Men's sports included baseball, basketball, football, golf, soccer and tennis; while women's sports included basketball, golf, soccer, softball and tennis.

Greek life
 Alpha Gamma Delta – Theta Pi chapter – 1997–2011
 Alpha Kappa Alpha – Omicron Omicron chapter 
 Alpha Omicron Pi – Omega Omicron chapter – 1957–2011
 Alpha Xi Delta – Gamma Iota chapter – 1957–1984
 Kappa Alpha Order – Gamma Omicron chapter – 1957–2011
 Kappa Sigma – Epsilon Psi chapter – 1958–2011
 Phi Mu – Kappa Nu chapter – 1969–2011
 Sigma Kappa – Gamma Xi chapter – 1957–1991
 Sigma Phi Epsilon – Tennessee Zeta chapter – 1971–2011

Notable alumni
 Ron Dixon – player for the National Football League New York Giants
 William M. Greathouse – President of Trevecca Nazarene University, President of Nazarene Theological Seminary; General Superintendent in the Church of the Nazarene
 Ray King – Major League Baseball pitcher for 10 seasons. 
 Lee Hee-ho – First Lady of the Republic of Korea
 Adriane Lenox – Tony Award-winning actress
 James W. Moore – Methodist minister and author
 Stefan Rodgers – offensive tackle for the Baltimore Ravens
 Tia Sillers – Grammy Award-winning song writer
 Corey Webster –  New Zealand basketball player

References

External links
 University of Memphis – Lambuth
 
 Official athletics website 

 
Educational institutions established in 1843
Educational institutions disestablished in 2011
Universities and colleges accredited by the Southern Association of Colleges and Schools
Defunct private universities and colleges in Tennessee
Jackson, Tennessee
Education in Madison County, Tennessee
1843 establishments in Tennessee